Norman Hedley Alvin (31 May 1916 – 11 November 2001) was an Australian rules footballer who played with Hawthorn in the Victorian Football League (VFL).

Notes

External links 

1916 births
2001 deaths
Australian rules footballers from Victoria (Australia)
Hawthorn Football Club players
Brighton Football Club players